Hocazade Camii is a light-rail station on the Konak Tram of the Tram İzmir system in İzmir, Turkey. It is located on Ali Çetinkaya Boulevard, near the Hocazade Mosque, from which the station gets its name. The station consists of two side platforms serving two tracks. Two blocks west of the station is Kıbrıs Şehitleri Avenue, the main street of Alsancak, with many shops, cafes, restaurants and bars. 

Hocazade Camii station opened on 24 March 2018.

Connections
ESHOT operates city bus service on Şair Eşref Boulevard on late night hours.

Gallery

Nearby Places of Interest
Kıbrıs Şehitleri Avenue - The main street of Alsancak

References

Railway stations opened in 2018
2018 establishments in Turkey
Konak District
Tram transport in İzmir